Skivington is a surname. Notable people with the surname include:

 George Skivington (born 1982), English rugby union player
 Karl Skivington, member of the band Spotlight Kid
 Mike Skivington (1921–2012), Scottish footballer

See also
 George v Skivington (1869), a leading case in English consumer law
Skeffington